Constantinos Antonopoulos (Greek: Κωνσταντίνος Αντωνόπουλος) is a founding member, shareholder and CEO of Intralot.

Business
Constantinos Antonopoulos is a founding member and shareholder of Intralot, a Greek company that supplies integrated gaming, transaction processing systems, game content, sports betting management and interactive gaming services to state-licensed gaming organizations worldwide. In 1992, the year that the company was established, he assumed his current position as chief executive officer. Under his leadership the company has grown its presence to 56 countries and its workforce to more than 5,500 people. He is the chairman of many companies of the group and a non - executive member of the board of directors of Intracom Holdings. In November 2014 Constantinos Antonopoulos resigned from his position as Intralot's CEO.

Honors & Affiliations
Constantinos Antonopoulos was honored with numerous significant distinctions; among others he was distinguished internationally in the “Lottery industry Hall of Fame”, as one of the most important professionals in the lottery industry An essential initiative that Constantinos Antonopoulos took was Intralot’s becoming a founding member of the Global Growth Companies community, the “New Champions of the World Economic Forum”. He is a member of the board of directors of the Federation of Greek Industries (SEV) and participates in the Foreign Affairs Executive Committee of the Federation (SEV International).

Personal info
Born in the city of Patras, Constantinos Antonopoulos graduated in 1976 from the National Technical University of Athens with a degree in electrical engineering. He continued his studies at the University of Manchester (UMIST), England and received a Master of Science (M.Sc.) degree in systems reliability. He is married and father of three children.

References

External links
Intralot official website
Intracom corporate website

Greek businesspeople
Living people
Year of birth missing (living people)